Anna Vitalievna Bashta (born 10 July 1996 in Togliatti, Russia) is a Russian-born Azerbaijani fencer. She won the silver medal in the women's sabre event at the 2022 World Fencing Championships held in Cairo, Egypt. She competed at the 2020 Summer Olympics, in Women's sabre.

Career 
She won one gold medal and one silver at the 2015 Summer Universiade. She represented Russia until 2018.

Bashta claimed a spot in the sabre events as the winner of Zonal Qualifier – Europe which was held in Madrid, Spain. She beat Anna Limbach of Germany in the final 15-13 to qualify for the 2020 Olympics in Tokyo, Japan.

She won the gold medal in the women's sabre event at the 2022 European Fencing Championships held in Antalya, Turkey.

See also
 Russia at the 2015 Summer Universiade

References

External links
 Anna Bashta at FIG

1996 births
Living people
Sportspeople from Tolyatti
Russian emigrants to Azerbaijan
Naturalized citizens of Azerbaijan
Azerbaijani female sabre fencers
Russian female sabre fencers
Medalists at the 2015 Summer Universiade
Competitors at the 2017 Summer Universiade
Universiade medalists in fencing
Universiade gold medalists for Russia
Universiade silver medalists for Russia
Fencers at the 2020 Summer Olympics
Olympic fencers of Azerbaijan
World Fencing Championships medalists